"Strait Playin'" is the second single released from Shaquille O'Neal's third album, You Can't Stop the Reign. It was produced by DJ Quik and featured verses from Quik and Peter Gunz. The song was a slight improvement from the album's first single, peaking at number 33 on the Hot R&B/Hip-Hop Singles & Tracks. The song was also featured on the soundtrack to the film Steel starring O'Neal himself.

Track listing

A-Side
"Strait Playin'" (Superman Extended Mix)- 6:05
"Strait Playin'" (Superman Extended Instrumental)- 5:30

B-Side
"No Love Lost" (LP Version)- 3:51
"No Love Lost" (King Tech Remix)- 4:27
"No Love Lost" (Acapella)- 3:46

References

1997 singles
Shaquille O'Neal songs
DJ Quik songs
Song recordings produced by DJ Quik
Songs written by Shaquille O'Neal
Interscope Records singles
1996 songs